Bairi is a village of Sialkot District in the Punjab province of Pakistan. It has an altitude of 292 metres (961 feet) lying in the east of the district.

References

Villages in Sialkot District